Elma Davis (1 April 1968 – 14 April 2019) was a South African international lawn bowler.

Bowls career
In 2016, Davis won a bronze medal with Susan Nel and Sylvia Burns in the triples at the 2016 World Outdoor Bowls Championship in Christchurch.

Davis was part of the South African team for the 2018 Commonwealth Games on the Gold Coast in Queensland where she claimed a silver medal in the Fours with Esme Kruger, Johanna Snyman and Nicolene Neal.

Davis was a five times winner of the National Championships (three in fours and two in pairs) bowling for the George Bowls Club.

Death
On 14 April 2019, Davis died during an apparent murder suicide perpetrated by her husband.

References

1968 births
2019 deaths
Bowls players at the 2018 Commonwealth Games
Commonwealth Games silver medallists for South Africa
Commonwealth Games medallists in lawn bowls
South African female bowls players
White South African people
Murder–suicides in Africa
Medallists at the 2018 Commonwealth Games